Anaxilaus or Anaxilas of Larissa (century BC) was a physician and Pythagorean philosopher. According to Eusebius, he was banished from Rome in 28 BC by Augustus on the charge of practicing magic. Anaxilaus wrote about the "magical" properties of minerals, herbs, and other substances and derived drugs, and is cited by Pliny in this regard. His exceptional knowledge of natural science allowed him to produce tricks that were mistaken for magic.

References

1st-century BC Greek physicians
Ancient Larissaeans
Neo-Pythagoreans
Ancient Roman philosophers
1st-century BC philosophers
Ancient Roman exiles
People convicted of witchcraft